Lumbu is a Bantu language spoken in Gabon and the Republic of the Congo.

References

Languages of Gabon
Sira languages
Languages of the Republic of the Congo